Pansy Ellen Beach (November 26, 1890 – December 12, 1957), known by the pen name Pansy E. Black, was an American stenographer and writer of science fiction and fantasy.

Personal life 
Pansy Ellen Beach was born in Charles City, Iowa in 1890, the daughter of Spencer Beach and Lillian E. Briggs Beach. She had three older siblings, a sister Daisy, and brothers Leo and George. She married Texas legislator William Alexander Black in 1918. They had a son, Robert George Black. She was widowed when her husband died in 1935. Her son died in 1950; the following year, she accepted a Canadian War Service Medal awarded to her son posthumously, for his service during World War II. She died in San Antonio, Texas in 1957, aged 67 years.

Black was active in a theosophy society in San Antonio. At a 1933 meeting, she lectured on future technologies, including wireless power and telephones. "We are only on the threshold of the electrical age," she declared. She predicted that "The time will come shortly when no man will have any privacy of any sort".

Writing 
Black's stories "The Valley of the Great Ray" (1930) and "The Men from the Meteor" (1932) were published by editor Hugo Gernsback in his Science Fiction Series booklets. "The Valley of the Great Ray" is a lost race tale, while "The Men from the Meteor" is a tale of alien invasion. Both stories are set in Australia and involve rays destroying a hidden lost race or alien civilization. Her story "Graah, Foiler of Destiny" (1939) is a historical fantasy narrative that appeared in the short-lived magazine Golden Fleece Historical Adventure (1938-1939).

Bibliography

Short fiction 

 "The Valley of the Great Ray" (1930) (novelette)
 "The Men from the Meteor" (1932) (novelette)
 "Graah, Foiler of Destiny" (1939) (short story)

References

External links 
 Pansy E. Black at the Internet Speculative Fiction Database
 "Graah, Foiler of Destiny" on The Internet Archive

1890 births
1957 deaths
American science fiction writers
American fantasy writers
Women science fiction and fantasy writers
People from Charles City, Iowa
Writers from Iowa
Stenographers
20th-century American women writers